Rafael Alonso-Alonso (September 9, 1939  San Juan, Puerto Rico – June 10, 2022 Ponce, Puerto Rico) was a former Associate Justice of the Puerto Rico Supreme Court.

Rafael Alonso Alonso was a Cum Laude graduate of the University of Puerto Rico and obtained his J.D. Cum Laude from the University of Puerto Rico Law School. Graduated from the Institute of Judicial Administration of the New York Law School. Was commissioned as 2nd lieutenant in the Army ROTC program.

Prior to being appointed to the bench by Governor Rafael Hernández Colón, he served as director of the Office of Legislative Services of Puerto Rico from 1965 to 1968, as director of UPR's Graduate School of Public Administration from 1969 to 1972, and as president of the Puerto Rico Planning Board from 1973 to 1976.

He served as Associate Justice from May 6, 1985, until his retirement from the court on July 14, 1995.

Alonso died on June 10, 2022.

References

La Justicia en sus Manos by Luis Rafael Rivera, 

Associate Justices of the Supreme Court of Puerto Rico
Puerto Rican lawyers
People from San Juan, Puerto Rico
New York Law School alumni
University of Puerto Rico alumni
University of Puerto Rico faculty
1939 births
2022 deaths